Abbottabad International Medical Institute is a private medical college of Abbottabad, Pakistan.

See also
 Women Medical and Dental College Abbottabad

References

Abbottabad District
Educational institutions established in 2008
2008 establishments in Pakistan
Universities and colleges in Khyber Pakhtunkhwa
Medical colleges in Khyber Pakhtunkhwa